Thomas James Sandt (December 22, 1950 – December 1, 2020) was an American Major League Baseball player and coach, as well as a minor league manager. His professional playing career lasted all or parts of 15 seasons, and his MLB coaching tenure lasted for 16 years. He was the first-base coach of the 1997 world-champion Florida Marlins.

Early life
Born in Brooklyn, Sandt graduated from Pacifica High School in West Garden Grove, California, in 1968.

Career
He was selected by Oakland in the second round of the 1969 Major League Baseball draft, and made his pro debut that season. His MLB playing career consisted of 42 games: one appearance on June 29, 1975, as a defensive replacement at second base against the California Angels, and 41 games as a utility infielder in 1976, when he spent the entire season on the Oakland roster. In the majors, Sandt batted .209 in 67 at bats, with his 14 hits including one double. In the field, he got into 29 games as a shortstop, ten as a second baseman, and two as a third baseman.

Sandt joined the Pittsburgh Pirates' organization in 1979 while still an active player. He then managed Pirate farm teams in the Eastern League and Pacific Coast League from 1982 to 1986, and was voted 1984's PCL Manager of the Year while managing the Hawaii Islanders. In 1987, he joined the MLB coaching staff of Pittsburgh manager Jim Leyland, and worked under Leyland for the next 13 years with the Pirates (through 1996), Marlins (1997–1998) and Colorado Rockies (1999). He then returned to Pittsburgh for a 2-year stint under skippers Gene Lamont (2000) and Lloyd McClendon (2001–2002).

Death
Sandt died on December 1, 2020, in Lake Oswego, Oregon.

References

External links

1950 births
2020 deaths
Baseball players from New York (state)
Birmingham A's players
Buffalo Bisons (minor league) managers
Burlington Bees players
Cangrejeros de Santurce (baseball) players
Colorado Rockies (baseball) coaches
Florida Marlins coaches
Hawaii Islanders managers
Hawaii Islanders players
Liga de Béisbol Profesional Roberto Clemente infielders
Lynn Pirates (1983) players
Major League Baseball first base coaches
Major League Baseball second basemen
Major League Baseball shortstops
Minor league baseball managers
Navegantes del Magallanes players
American expatriate baseball players in Venezuela
New Orleans Pelicans (baseball) players
Oakland Athletics players
Pittsburgh Pirates coaches
Portland Beavers players
Sportspeople from Brooklyn
Baseball players from New York City
Syracuse Chiefs players
Tigres de Aragua players
Tri-City A's players
Tucson Toros players